In the small Mediterranean island nation of Malta the predominant religion is Roman Catholicism.

History of Christianity in Malta

Saint Paul
The apostle Paul's time in Malta is described in the Book of Acts. Tradition holds that the church was founded by its patrons Saint Paul the Apostle and Saint Publius, who was its first bishop. The Islands of St. Paul (or St. Paul's Islets), in effect only one island during low tide, are traditionally believed to be the site where Saint Paul was shipwrecked in the year 60 AD, on his way to trial and eventual martyrdom in Rome.

Establishment of the Archdiocese of Malta

According to tradition, Publius, the Roman Governor of Malta at the time of Saint Paul's shipwreck, became the first Bishop of Malta following his conversion to Christianity. After ruling the Maltese Church for 31 years, Publius was transferred to the See of Athens in 90 AD, where he was martyred in 125 AD. There is scant information about the continuity of Christianity in Malta in subsequent years, although tradition has it that there was a continuous line of bishops from the days of St. Paul to the time of Emperor Constantine. The Acts of the Council of Chalcedon record that in 451 AD, a certain Acacius was Bishop of Malta (Melitenus Episcopus). It is also known that in 501 AD, a certain Constantinus, Episcopus Melitenensis, was present at the Fifth General Council. In 588 Tucillus, Miletinae civitatis episcopus, was deposed by Pope Gregory I, and his successor Trajan elected by the clergy and people of Malta in 599 AD. The last recorded Bishop of Malta before the Arab invasion of the Islands was a Greek by the name of Manas, who was subsequently incarcerated at Palermo, Sicily.

Sovereignty of the Order
While the Maltese Islands were under the dominion of the Knights of Malta, from the 15th century through to the late 18th century, the Grand Master had the status of a prince of the Catholic Church, and enjoyed a special relationship with the Pope, which occasionally led to a considerable amount of friction with the local Bishops. Occasional attempts to implant Quakerism and other forms of Protestantism in the 17th century were unsuccessful.

French occupation
Over the years, the power of the Knights declined; their reign ended when Napoleon Bonaparte's fleet arrived in 1798, en route to his expedition of Egypt. As a ruse, Napoleon asked for safe harbor to resupply his ships, and then turned his guns against his hosts once safely inside Valletta.  Grand Master Hompesch capitulated, and Napoleon stayed in Malta for a few days during which he systematically looted the moveable assets of the Order and established an administration controlled by his nominees.  He then sailed for Egypt leaving a substantial garrison in Malta.  Since the Order had also been growing unpopular with the local Maltese, the latter initially viewed the French with optimism. This illusion did not last long. Within months the French were closing convents and seizing church treasures. The Maltese people rebelled, and the French garrison of General Claude-Henri Belgrand de Vaubois retreated into Valletta. After several failed attempts by the locals to retake Valletta, they asked the British for assistance. Rear Admiral Lord Horatio Nelson decided on a total blockade, and in 1800 the French garrison surrendered.

Establishment of the Diocese of Gozo

Historically part of the Diocese of Malta, Gozitans brought forward several petitions for the creation of an independent diocese, including in 1798, during the French occupation, and again in 1836.  A third petition, brought directly to Pope Pius IX in 1855, met with success.  Instrumental in this effort were a young priest named Don Pietro Pace, who would several years later serve as Bishop of Gozo, and Sir Adriano Dingli, Crown Advocate.  The British Colonial Office signalled its approval in October 1860.

In 1863, Archpriest Michele Francesco Buttigieg was elected Auxiliary Bishop of Malta with instructions to reside in Gozo.  One year later, on September 16, 1864, the Pope issued a Bull entitled "Singulari Amore" (With remarkable Love), which decreed that the islands of Gozo and Comino were separated from the Diocese of Malta.  On September 22, 1864, Bishop Buttigieg was elected the first bishop of Gozo, with the "Matrice" in Victoria, dedicated to the Assumption of the Blessed Virgin (Maltese: "Marija Assunta"), serving as his Cathedral.

United Kingdom
In 1814, Malta became British in accordance with the Treaty of Paris.  British rule lasted 150 years until 1964 when Malta gained independence.  British rule brought the first sizeable population of members of the Anglican Church and Protestant denominations in the form of civil servants and retirees.

Patron saints

Saint Paul
St. Paul is venerated as the patron saint of Malta.  A number of parishes throughout Malta and Gozo are dedicated to him, including: the Cathedral Church at Mdina, the Collegiates of Rabat and Valletta, and the parishes of Ħal-Safi and Munxar.

Saint Publius
Saint Publius is the first Maltese Saint, a patron saint of Malta and Floriana, and also the first Bishop of the Maltese Islands. The Floriana Parish Church is dedicated to St. Publius. There is a huge devotion across Malta towards this Saint as he was also Maltese.

Saint Agatha
Saint Agatha, is also a patron Saint of Malta as during the persecution in Sicily she came to Malta and kept on teaching the Maltese the Christian faith.

Out of approximately 60 parishes in Malta and Gozo, 11 are dedicated to the Assumption. These include the Cathedral Church of Gozo, the parishes of Gudja, Ħal-Għaxaq, l-Imqabba, Qrendi, Mosta, Dingli, Attard, Mġarr, Birkirkara and Żebbuġ (Gozo).  Many other churches have a treasured statue representing the mystery of the Assumption.  As titular statues, they are the most treasured sacred artifacts of their respective communities.  All statues in churches are kept with great care and devotion, however the devotion to statues representing patrons of villages is far greater than devotion to other representations.

Noteworthy details linked to the feast of the Assumption are the world-famous Mosta Rotunda  (known as the Mosta Dome), the magnificent Gozo Cathedral found in the old Citadel , and the exceptional annual fireworks display held on 14 August at Imqabba, organized by the St Mary Fireworks Factory of Imqabba, winners of the First Malta International Fireworks Festival (2006).  This fireworks display is renowned as the best pyro-musical show on the island and thousands cram the village streets annually in order to watch it.

Current status and law
The Constitution of Malta provides for freedom of religion but establishes Roman Catholicism as the state religion. Freedom House and the World Factbook report that 98 per cent of the Maltese are Roman Catholic, making the nation one of the most Catholic countries in the world. The rate of regular mass attendance was estimated at 36.1% in 2017, down from 52.6% (51% for Malta Island, 72.7% for Gozo) in 2005. In 1995 the rate stood at 63.4%.  There are two territorial jurisdictions: the Archdiocese of Malta and the Diocese of Gozo.

In public schools religious instruction in Roman Catholicism is part of the curriculum but students may opt to decline participation in religious lessons. Subsidies are granted to private Catholic schools.

Pope John Paul II made a total of three pastoral visits to Malta – twice in 1990 and once in 2001, during which he beatified three Maltese.

Religious toleration is the norm, with the non-Roman Catholics mainly consisting of small communities of Muslims and Jews, in addition to Anglican and Protestant communities consisting mostly of British retirees. There is one Muslim religious school in the country, and the government approved plans for a 500-grave Muslim cemetery .

The percentage of people that attend Mass in every locality of Malta in 2005:

Other totals of people attending Mass, because these localities are not in percentage:

Additionally, between a quarter and a fifth of Mass attendees are active members of a Church Movement, group or initiatives such as the Catholic Charismatic Renewal, the Neocatechumenal Way, the Legion of Mary, Opus Dei, Youth Fellowship or other Church groups within the parish.  Malta also has the highest number of members of the Neocatechumenal Way per population in the world.

Malta introduced divorce after a referendum on the 28 May 2011. In an SMS poll, Malta chose the Maltese cross to be the image on the Maltese Euro and rejected one of John the Baptist baptizing Jesus, which had garnered a strong majority in a previous poll, after attracting opposition even from the local Bishops who did not see it fit to place Jesus' face on a coin.

Patron saints in Malta

Assumption of Mary, the patron of Attard, Birkirkara, Bubaqra, Dingli, Gudja, Għaxaq, Mġarr, Mosta, Mqabba, Qrendi, Victoria, Malta, and Żebbuġ, Gozo
Corpus Christi (Body of Christ), the patron of Għasri
Christ the King, the patron of Paola, Malta
Holy Family, the patron of Bidnija and Iklin
Holy Trinity, the patron of Marsa, Malta
Immaculate Conception, the patron of Bormla, Ħamrun, Mqabba, Qala and Swieqi
Jesus of Nazareth, the patron of Sliema
Maria Regina, the patron of Marsa, Malta
Nativity of Mary, the patron of Mellieħa, Naxxar, Senglea, and Xagħra
Our Lady of Fatima, the patron of Pietà, Malta
Our Lady of Good Counsel, the patron of Paceville
Our Lady of Graces, the patron of Xgħajra and Żabbar
Our Lady of Lourdes, the patron of Paola, Malta, Qrendi and San Ġwann
Our Lady of Mount Carmel, the patron of Balluta, Fgura, Fleur-de-Lys, Gżira, Valletta, Xlendi, and Żurrieq
Our Lady of Pompeii, the patron of Marsaxlokk
Our Lady of Porto Salvo, the patron of Valletta
Our Lady of Sorrows, the patron of San Pawl il-Baħar
Our Lady of Angels, the patron of Baħar iċ-Ċagħaq
Our Lady of Loreto, the patron of Għajnsielem
Our Lady of Perpetual Help, the patron of Kerċem
Our Lady of Ta' Pinu, the patron of Gozo
Our Lady, Star of the Sea, the patron of Sliema
Risen Christ, the patron of Pembroke, Malta
Sacred Heart of Jesus, the patron of Fontana, Malta
Sacred Heart of Mary, the patron of Burmarrad and Sliema
Saint Andrew, the patron saint of Luqa
Saint Anne, the patron saint of Dwejra, Marsaskala and Żebbiegħ
Saint Augustine of Hippo, the patron saint of Valletta
Saint Bartholomew the Apostle, the patron saint of Għargħur
Saint Cajetan, the patron saint of Ħamrun
Saint Catherine of Alexandria, the patron saint of Żejtun and Żurrieq
Saint Dominic, the patron saint of Birgu and Valletta
Saint Francis of Assisi, the patron saint of Qawra
Saint George, the patron saint of Qormi and Victoria, Malta
Saint George Preca, the patron saint of Swatar (Birkirkara)
Saint Gregory, the patron saint of Kerċem and Sliema
Saint John of the Cross, the patron saint of Ta' Xbiex
Saint John the Baptist, the patron saint of Valletta and Xewkija
Saint Joseph, the patron saint of Birkirkara, Għaxaq, Kalkara, Kirkop, Manikata, Msida, Qala and Xemxija
Saint Julian the Hospitaller, the patron saint of San Ġiljan
Saint Helena (Empress), the patron saint of Birkirkara
Saint Lawrence of Rome, the patron saint of Birgu and San Lawrenz
Saint Leonard, the patron saint of Kirkop
Saint Lucy, the patron saint of Mtarfa and Santa Luċija, Gozo
Saint Margaret the Virgin, the patron saint of Sannat
Saint Martin of Tours, the patron saint of Baħrija
Saint Maximilian Kolbe, the patron saint of Buġibba
Saint Nicholas, the patron saint of Siġġiewi
Saint Paul, the patron saint of Marsalforn, Mdina, Munxar, Nadur Rabat, Malta, Safi, Malta, and Valletta
Saint Peter, the patron saint of Birżebbuġa and Nadur
Saint Philip of Agira, the patron saint of Żebbuġ, Malta
Saint Pius X, the patron saint of Santa Luċija
Saint Publius, the patron saint of Floriana, Malta
Saint Sebastian, the patron saint of Qormi
The Annunciation, the patron of Balzan and Tarxien
The Transfiguration of Jesus, the patron of Lija
Visitation of the Blessed Virgin Mary, the patron of Għarb

Other saints venerated in Malta

Mater Bon Consilii, the patron of Paceville
Our Lady of Angels, the patron of Bahar ic-Caghaq
Our Lady of the Abandoned, the patron of Wardija
Our Lady of Cicero, in Zebbug, Gozo
Our Lady of Doctrine, the patron of Tarxien
Our Lady of Grotto, in Mellieha and Rabat, Malta
Our Lady of Liesse, in Valletta
Our Lady of Light, in Zebbug, Malta
Our Lady of Lily, the patron of Mqabba
Our Lady of Mercy, the patron of Bir id-Deheb
Our Lady of Miracles, in Lija
Our Lady of Montserrat, in Birgu
Our Lady of Providence, in Siggiewi
Our Lady of Rosary, the patron of Gudja
Our Lady of Ta Pinu, in Gharb
Our Lady of the Rock, in Gzira
Saint Agatha, the patron of Malta 
Saint Albert
Saint Alexis
Saint Alphonsus
Saint Alysius, in Birkirkara
Saint Angel, in Zejtun
Saint Anthony, patron of Birkirkara 
Saint Anthony the Abbot, in Mosta 
Saint Aristides 
Saint Barbara 
Saint Basil, in Mqabba
Saint Benedict 
Saint Bernard
Saint Bernadette 
Saint Baglan
Saint Blaise
Saint Cataldus
Saint Cecil
Saint Charles
Saint Christopher 
Saint Claire 
Saint Clement 
Saint Clementin
Saint Constantine 
Saint Cyrus
Saint David, in Mtarfa
Saint Deodatus
Saint Dmitry, in Gharb
Saint Edward, in Birgu
Saint Elias 
Saint Elizabeth
Saint Emidius
Saint Erasmus, in Valletta
Saint Faustina 
Saint Faustina Kowalska 
Saint Felix
Saint Francis Xavier 
Saint Fredrick
Saint Gabriel 

Saint Gerald 
Saint Henry
Saint Ignatius of Loyola 
Saint James, in Zabbar 
Saint Jerome 
Saint Joachim
Saint John, in Valletta
Saint John Bosco
Saint John Paul II
Saint John the Evangelist 
Saint Lazare 
Saint Leo
Saint Leopold
Saint Liberata 
Saint Lucian
Saint Luke
Saint Mansuy
Saint Marcianus 
Saint Mark 
Saint Martha
Saint Martin, the patron of Bahrija
Saint Mary Magdalene, the patron of Madliena 
Saint Matthew, in Qrendi
Saint Maximilian Kolbe, the patron of Bugibba 
Saint Michael, the patron of Zabbar
Saint Monica 
Saint Oswald, in Mtarfa
Saint Pacifico 
Saint Patrick 
Saint Pius V
Saint Porphyry 
Saint Raphael 
Saint Remigius 
Saint Rita
Saint Roch
Saint Rosa 
Saint Scholastica 
Saint Simon 
Saint Sophie
Saint Sylvester
Saint Stephen
Saint Theodora 
Saint Theresa 
Saint Theresa of Calcutta 
Saint Thomas, in Marsaskala 
Saint Timothy 
Saint Trophimus 
Saint Ubaldesca 
Saint Ursula
Saint Valentine, in Balzan 
Saint Victor 
Saint Vincent 
Saint Vincent de Paul, in Luqa
Saint Vincent Ferrer 
Saint Zachary

See also
Malta
Culture of Malta
Maltese people
Islam in Malta
History of the Jews in Malta
Religion by country
Roman Catholicism in Malta

References

External links
Profile of the Catholic Church in Malta
Homepage of the Archdiocese of Malta
Freedom House Country Report: Malta (2006)
Freedom House Country Report: Malta (2005)
Freedom House Country Report: Malta (2004)
Freedom House Country Report: Malta (2003)
Freedom House Country Report: Malta (2002)